Command Performance is a 1937 British musical drama film directed by Sinclair Hill and starring Arthur Tracy, Lilli Palmer and Mark Daly. It was based on a play by Stafford Dickens. Like The Street Singer, which was released the same year, it was designed as a vehicle for Tracy who performs a number of songs during the film. It was made at Pinewood Studios.

Plot
Growing tired of his life of fame, a singer runs away from a domineering manager and goes to live with a group of gypsies. A massive manhunt is whipped by the press to find him so that he can shoot the final scenes of his latest film.

Cast
 Arthur Tracy as Street Singer 
 Lilli Palmer as Susan 
 Mark Daly as Joe 
 Rae Collett as Betty 
 Finlay Currie as Manager 
 Jack Melford as Reporter 
 Stafford Hilliard as Sam 
 Julian Vedey as Toni 
 Phyllis Stanley as Olga

References

Bibliography
Low, Rachael. Filmmaking in 1930s Britain. George Allen & Unwin, 1985.
Wood, Linda. British Films, 1927–1939. British Film Institute, 1986.

External links

1937 films
1930s musical drama films
British films based on plays
Films directed by Sinclair Hill
Films shot at Pinewood Studios
British musical drama films
Films set in England
British black-and-white films
1937 drama films
1930s English-language films
1930s British films